Naveen Tajik is a former Pakistani TV and film actress who is known for playing role in a TV drama serial Quratul Ain. She also starred in films like Aj Diyan Kurrian (1977), Prince (1978), Parakh (1978), and  Khaak Aur Khoon (1979).

Life and career
Tajik belongs to a Pakistani Christian family. Her father was a military officer. As an actress, she debuted in mid-70s with a PTV drama Quratul Ain which was written by Ashfaq Ahmed. Later, she opted for a career in Lollywood and her first film was a Punjabi comic movie, Aj Diyan Kurrian (Today's Girls), released in 1977. In 1978, director S. Suleman cast her in his movie Prince in which she played a role of actor Nadeem's sister. In 1979, she played a central role in the movie  Khaak Aur Khoon. She also appeared in several other Urdu and Punjabi movies.

In 1980, Tajik quit the film industry and moved to US.

Personal life
Tajik is married and lives in US.

Filmography
 Aj Dian Kurian (1977)
 Ghazi Ilmuddin Shaheed (1978)
 Parakh (1978)
  Khaak Aur Khoon (1979)
 Pakeeza (1979)
 Kis Naam Se Pukaron (1979)

References

External links
 

20th-century Pakistani actresses
Pakistani television actresses
Pakistani film actresses
Possibly living people
Year of birth missing
Pakistani Christians